The Swiss National Science Foundation (SNSF, German: Schweizerischer Nationalfonds zur Förderung der wissenschaftlichen Forschung, SNF; French: Fonds national suisse de la recherche scientifique, FNS; Italian: Fondo nazionale svizzero per la ricerca scientifica) is a science research support organisation mandated by the Swiss Federal Government. The Swiss National Science Foundation was established under private law by physicist and medical doctor Alexander von Muralt in 1952.

Organisation 
The SNSF consists of three main bodies: Foundation Council, National Research Council and Administrative Offices. The Foundation Council is the highest authority and makes strategic decisions. The National Research Council is composed of distinguished  researchers who mostly work at Swiss institutions of higher education. They assess research proposals submitted to the SNSF and make funding decisions. The National Research Council comprises up to 100 members and is subdivided into four divisions:
 Division I: humanities and social sciences
 Division II: mathematics, natural sciences and engineering sciences
 Division III: biology and medicine
 Division IV: programmes (National Research Programmes and National Centres of Competence in Research)

The divisions work together with local Research Commissions, which are based at institutions of higher education. These commissions act as a link to the SNSF and they offer a local perspective on applications emanating from their institution.

The administrative offices support and coordinate the activities of the Foundation Council, the Research Council and the Research Commissions. Their tasks include financial controlling of research funding, requesting and evaluating external reviews of proposed projects, maintaining national and international contacts in the area of research policy, representing the SNSF in relevant bodies and communicating with the public. The administrative offices are located in Bern.

In 2016, Angelika Kalt was appointed Director of the SNSF.

At the helm of the SNSF are Jürg Stahl, President of the Foundation Council, Angelika Kalt, Director of the SNSF, and Matthias Egger, President of the National Research Council.

Funding schemes 
Mandated by the federal authorities, the Swiss National Science Foundation supports basic science in all academic disciplines. It evaluates research proposals submitted by researchers and funds projects selected on the basis of scientific criteria. The SNSF provides fundings for research projects and for research career, among which fellowships, SNSF professorships and Marie Heim-Vögtlin grants (programme for the promotion of women in research). By awarding fellowships and special grants, the SNSF also supports young researchers. 
In addition, the SNSF supports international collaborations with specific programmes and collaborations and it funds conferences and publications (mainly dissertations and habilitations).

Research Programmes and Centres of Competence in Research 
The National Research Programmes (NRP) and National Centres of Competence in Research (NCCR) are the most important research programmes of the SNSF. Mandated by the Federal Council, NRPs generate scientific knowledge aimed at solving pressing problems. They generally run for up to five years and have an overall budget of eight to twelve million Swiss francs. Since 1975, the SNSF has launched over 69 NRPs. NCCRs aim to strengthen research structures in Switzerland. Each NCCR is based at an institution of higher education and consists of a centre of competence as well as a national and international network. NCCRs benefit from SNSF funding of 20 to 60 million Swiss francs over a period of ten to twelve years, as well as university and third party funding.

National Centres of Competence in Research (NCCR) 

Completed:
 NCCR Finrisk.
 NCCR (IM)2 - National Centres of Competence in Research Interactive Multimodal Information Management.
 NCCR COME
 NCCR MICS
 NCCR Molecular oncology
 NCCR Genetics
 NCCR Structural biology
 NCCR Neuro
 NCCR Quantum photonics
 NCCR Nanoscale science - Swiss Nanoscience Institute.
 NCCR MaNEP - National Centres of Competence in Research Material with Novel Electronic Properties.
 NCCR North-South
 NCCR Plant Survival
 NCCR Climate
 NCCR Sesam

Ongoing:
 NCCR Affective Sciences
 NCCR Chemical Biology
 NCCR Democracy
 NCCR Iconic Criticism
 NCCR Kidney.CH
 NCCR LIVES
 NCCR Mediality
 NCCR MUST
 NCCR QSIT
 NCCR Robotics
 NCCR SYNAPSY
 NCCR Trade Regulation
 NCCR TransCure
 NCCR Bio-Inspired Materials
 NCCR Digital Fabrication
 NCCR MARVEL
 NCCR MSE
 NCCR On the Move
 NCCR PlanetS
 NCCR RNA & Disease
 NCCR SwissMAP

Research magazine Horizons 
The research magazine Horizons (German title: Horizonte, French title: Horizons) is a joint publication of the Swiss National Science Foundation and the Swiss Academies of Arts and Sciences (it was edited by the SNSF alone before 2012). In four quarterly editions, it reports on the latest results and insights from all research disciplines: from biology, medicine, natural sciences and mathematics to social and cultural sciences. The magazine addresses a broad public interested in research issues and is available as a free subscription (as well as freely accessible on-line).

Horizons has been available in English online since the publication of its hundredth issue in March 2014.

Other 

The Swiss National Science Foundation awards the Swiss Latsis Prize (funded by the Latsis Foundation).

See also 
 List of universities in Switzerland
 Science and technology in Switzerland
 United States National Science Foundation
 Swiss Academies of Arts and Sciences

Notes and references

External links 
  
 National Research Programmes (NRPs)
 National Centres of Competence in Research (NCCRs)
 Horizons, research magazine

Scientific organisations based in Switzerland
Organisations based in Bern
Foundations based in Switzerland
1952 establishments in Switzerland
Organizations established in 1952
Funding bodies of Switzerland
Research funding agencies